Prasanta Bihari Mukharji (1909 - 1984) was the 16th Chief Justice of the Calcutta High Court. He served as Chief Justice between 1970 and 1972. He authored numerous books mainly on law and philosophy. Mukharji also held the Tagore Law Professorship at the Calcutta University.

Family

Mukharji was the eldest son of Rai Bahadur Bejoy Bihari Mukharji. His youngest brother, Sabyasachi Mukharji, later became Chief Justice of India. Prasanta Bihari Mukharji was married to Gita Mukharji, who won the Indian Red Cross Society Medal in 1964.

Career

As a young lawyer he had been part of the legal team in the famous Bhawal case. Mukharji was the youngest lawyer in British India to have become a High Court judge. Mukharji was also a noted constitutional scholar and authored several books on the subject. Amongst his books on the subject were The Critical Problems of the Indian Constitution (1967), Three Elemental Problems of the Indian Constitution (1972) and The Indian Constitution: Change and Challenge (1976).
Aside from works on law and the constitution, Mukharji also authored books on Bengali literature and Vedantic philosophy. These included Bankim Sahitya Samaj O Sadhana [ Bankimchandra Chatterjee 's Writings: Society and Striving] (1967) and The Panorama of the Life, Message and Philosophy of Shankara (1977).

References

1909 births
1984 deaths
Chief Justices of the Calcutta High Court
20th-century Indian judges